Jacob Montgomery was a sharecropper and state legislator in North Carolina. He lived in Warrenton, North Carolina. He served in the North Carolina House of Representatives in 1883 and was then elected to the North Carolina Senate. He was African American.

See also

 African-American officeholders during and following the Reconstruction era

References

19th-century African-American politicians
19th-century American politicians
Members of the North Carolina House of Representatives
North Carolina state senators
Year of birth missing
Year of death missing